McGrath van Wyk (born 18 September 1987) is a former Namibian rugby union player who played as a wing represented Namibia internationally from 2009 to 2011. He made his international debut for Namibia against Ivory Coast on 14 June 2009. McGrath van Wyk was included in the Namibian squad for the 2011 Rugby World Cup.

References 

1987 births
Living people
Namibia international rugby union players
Namibian rugby union players
Rugby union players from Windhoek
Rugby union wings